The Main road 491 is a west–east direction Secondary class main road, that connects the Main road 49 change to the border of Ukraine.

The road, as well as all other main roads in Hungary, is managed and maintained by Magyar Közút, state owned company.

See also

 Roads in Hungary

Sources

External links

 Hungarian Public Road Non-Profit Ltd. (Magyar Közút Nonprofit Zrt.)
 National Infrastructure Developer Ltd.

Main roads in Hungary
Szabolcs-Szatmár-Bereg County